Madiun Regency is a landlocked Regency in East Java province, Indonesia. It covers an area of 1,010.86 km2, and had a population of 662,278 at the 2010 Census and 744,350 at the 2020 Census. It is bordered by Bojonegoro Regency in the north, Nganjuk Regency in the east, Ponorogo Regency in the south, and Magetan Regency and Ngawi Regency in the west, while the city of Madiun is an enclave within the regency.

Its capital was formerly the city of Madiun but became the district of Mejayan, in accordance with Government Regulation No.52 of the year 2010. However, Government Regulation No.3 of the Year 2019, as a revision of Government Regulation No. 52 of the year 2010, mentions that the capital of Madiun Regency is now called "Caruban", not Mejayan. The change of name of the capital city of Madiun Regency to "Caruban" is because of the history and culture of the former Regency of Caruban, of which "Mejayan" is only a part. In the Dutch Indies Government, Caruban was a District and Mejayan was an Onderdistrict (district), so after the Indonesian Independence, Caruban became Asisten of Regency (Pembantu Bupati) and Mejayan became Kecamatan. Caruban is more popular than Mejayan, because Caruban was a formerly regency established by Raden Cakrakusuma (Tumenggung Alap-Alap) from the Sultanate of Demak Bintara. The regents of the former Regency of Caruban were Raden Cakrakusuma I (Tumenggung Alap-Alap), Raden Cakrakusuma II (Tumenggung Emprit Gantil), Kanjeng Pangeran Mlatakusuma (a son of Kanjeng Pangeran Adipati Martalaya from Madiyun), Raden Tumenggung Somadirja, Raden Tumenggung Natasari, Raden Tumenggung Jayengrana II, Raden Tumenggung Wignya Subrata, and finally Raden Tumenggung Martanagara, so the last-named became the first regent of the modern Panaraga renamed Raden Adipati Martahadinegara.

Most government buildings are located in areas that are part of Caruban District. Other buildings will be moved gradually from the City of Madiun and the move began in 2011. In everyday conversation, Madiun Regency residents use the Javanese language with the dialect or dialects of Mataraman Madiun which is more inclined to accent Surakarta/Sala.

Administrative Districts
Madiun Regency consists of fifteen districts (kecamatan), tabulated below with their areas and population totals from the 2010 Census and the 2020 Census. The table also includes the number of administrative villages (rural desa and urban kelurahan) in each district, and its postal codes. 

Note: (a) except the village of Sidodadi, which has a post code of 63112.

History
Madiun is an area pioneered by Ki Panembahan Ronggo Jumeno, also called Ki Ageng Ronggo. The origin of the word "Madiun" is medi (ghost) and ayun-ayun (swing), the point is that when Ronggo Jumeno do "Tripe Madiun land" occurs many ghosts wandering around. A second explanation for the name keris owned by Ronggo Jumeno named Kris Tundhung Medhiun. At first not named Madiun, but Wonoasri.

Since the beginning of Madiun is a territory under the control of the Sultanate of Mataram. In the course of the history of Mataram, Madiun is very strategically located in the region since the middle of the border with the kingdom of Kadiri (Daha). Therefore, during the reign of many rebels Mataram kingdom building a power base in Madiun. As the emergence of figures Retno Dumilah.

Some relics of the Duchy of Madiun one of which can be seen in the Village Kuncen, where there is the tomb of Ki Ageng Panembahan Ronggo Jumeno, Patih Wonosari besides the graves of the Regent Madiun, Madiun's oldest mosque is Masjid Nur Hidayatullah, artifacts around the mosque, and spring (bathing place) sacred.

Since the time of the Dutch East Indies, Madiun is a gemeente self-governing (autonomous) because the Dutch community working in various industrial estates and do not want to be governed by the Regents (which is Javanese). As an autonomous city, Madiun was founded on June 20, 1918, the first led by Madiun resident assistant. New since 1927 headed by a mayor.

Madiun Affair

The Madiun Affair was a communist uprising in 1948 during the Indonesian National Revolution in the town of Madiun. Leftist parties led an uprising against the leaders of the newly declared Indonesian Republic, but it was quashed by Republican forces.

On 18 September 1948 an 'Indonesian Soviet Republic' was declared in Madiun, in the western part of East Java, by members of the Indonesian Communist Party (PKI) and the Indonesian Socialist Party (PSI). Judging the time as right for a proletarian uprising, they intended it to be a rallying center for revolt against "Sukarno-Hatta, the slaves of the Japanese and America". Madiun, however, was won back by Republican forces within a few weeks, and the insurgency leader, Musso, was killed. During the fighting, RM Suryo, the governor of East Java, as well as several police officers and religious leaders, were killed by the rebels.

The quashing of the rebellion ended a perilous distraction for the Revolution, and it turned vague American sympathies based on anti-colonial sentiments into diplomatic support. Internationally, the Republic was now seen as being staunchly anti-communist and a potential ally in the brewing global Cold War between the American-led 'free world' and the Soviet-led bloc.

Transport

Road
Madiun is on the main road to Yogyakarta and Jakarta.

Rail

The county is also crossed by railway lines across southern Java. Significant cities and districts are:
 Caruban
 Saradan
 Dolopo
 Dagangan
 Balerejo

Topography
The northern part of Madiun is a hilly region, which is part of the Kendeng Mountains. The middle part is a plateau and undulating, being the southeast part of the Mount Wilis - Mount Liman mountain range.

Agriculture and crafts
Prominent activities are:
 farming of rice, soybeans and pulses
 plantations of cocoa, coffee, mango, durian, rambutan and forest products 
 processed products, such as teak wood crafts

Durian and cocoa are cultivated in Dagangan District and Kare District. There is a Coffee garden with large-scale cultivation in Kandangan, Kare District, which is of Dutch heritage.

Visitor attractions
Liman is the highest mountain peak in the Mountains Wilis range, promising an extraordinary sensation of climbing. Much fauna and flora are found along the route as are statues of Pulosari, Kare District. Unfortunately, these pathways are rarely traveled by the climber, because the access is difficult. If the path Kare-Lake Ngebel District already had asphalting, it would rival the charm of other mountains in Java. The slopes have tremendous tourism potential. Attractions include:
 Slampir Waterfall
 Grantham Monument
 General Sudirman Monument 
 Selorejo Waterfall
 Kandangan Coffee Plantation
 Grape Tour Wana

References

External links